Singles 1987–1992 is the first compilation album by the Japanese girl band Princess Princess, released on July 15, 1992, by Sony Records. The album compiles the band's singles from 1987 to 1992, including their five consecutive No. 1 hits "Diamonds", "Sekai de Ichiban Atsui Natsu", "Oh Yeah!", "Julian", and "Kiss".

The album stayed at No. 1 on Oricon's albums chart for four consecutive weeks, becoming the band's fourth of five consecutive No. 1 albums. It was also certified as a Million seller and Quadruple Platinum by the RIAJ.

Track listing 
All music is composed by Kaori Okui, except where indicated; all music is arranged by Princess Princess and Masanori Sasaji.

Charts

Certification

References

External links
 
 
 

Princess Princess (band) compilation albums
1992 compilation albums
Compilation albums by Japanese artists
Sony Music Entertainment Japan compilation albums
Japanese-language compilation albums